BD-11 4672 is a 9th magnitude orange dwarf star located 88.7 light-years away in the constellation of Scutum. This star was recognised as a high proper motion star by Max Wolf in 1924. It is a single star, and is the host to two known extrasolar planets.

Characteristics 
BD-11 4672 is an K-type main sequence star. Its age is not well constrained, but is probably older than the Sun. Its metallicity is 35% that of the Sun. No significant flare activity was detected.

Planetary system 
In 2010, a team of astronomers led by astronomer C. Moutou of the High Accuracy Radial Velocity Planet Searcher performed a radial-velocity analysis, which led to the suspicion of a gas giant planet in orbit around BD-11 4672. The planet existence was proven in 2014. In 2020, another gas giant planet was detected.

References 

90979
K-type main-sequence stars
Scutum (constellation)
Planetary systems with two confirmed planets
Durchmusterung objects
J18332885-1138097
TIC objects